EPBL may refer to:
 École Privée Belge de Lubumbashi
 Continental Basketball Association, also known as the Eastern Pennsylvania Basketball League and the Eastern Professional Basketball League
 Empire Professional Baseball League